was a Japanese mathematician who studied group theory.

Biography
He was a professor at the University of Illinois at Urbana–Champaign from 1953 to his death.  He also had visiting positions at the University of Chicago (1960–61), the Institute for Advanced Study (1962–63, 1968–69, spring 1981), the University of Tokyo (spring 1971), and the University of Padua (1994).  Suzuki received his Ph.D. in 1952 from the University of Tokyo, despite having moved to the United States the previous year.  He was the first to attack the Burnside conjecture, that every finite non-abelian simple group has even order.

A notable achievement was his discovery in 1960 of the Suzuki groups, an infinite family of the only non-abelian simple groups whose order is not divisible by 3. The smallest, of order 29120, was the first simple group of order less than 1 million to be discovered since Dickson's list of 1900.

He classified several classes of simple groups of small rank, including the CIT-groups and C-groups and CA-groups.

There is also a sporadic simple group called the Suzuki group, which he announced in 1968.  The Tits ovoid is also referred to as the Suzuki ovoid.

He wrote several textbooks in Japanese.

See also
Baer–Suzuki theorem
Bender–Suzuki theorem
Brauer–Suzuki theorem
Brauer–Suzuki–Wall theorem

Publications

References

  M. Aschbacher, H. Bender, W. Feit, R. Solomon, Michio Suzuki (1926–1998), Notices Amer. Math. Soc. 46 (1999), no. 5, 543–551.

External links

20th-century Japanese mathematicians
20th-century American mathematicians
1926 births
1998 deaths
Group theorists
University of Illinois Urbana-Champaign faculty